Michael Joseph Sullivan (October 23, 1866 – June 14, 1906) was an American professional baseball player.

He led the National League in win–loss percentage (.750) in 1892.

In 10 seasons he had a 54–65 win–loss record, 160 games (119 started), 99 complete games, 1 shutout, 40 games finished, 4 saves,  innings pitched, 1,292 hits allowed, 892 runs allowed, 622 earned runs allowed, 45 home runs allowed, 568 walks allowed, 285 strikeouts, 18 hit batsmen, 76 wild pitches, a 5.04 ERA and a 1.674 WHIP.

Sullivan died in his hometown at the age of 39.

External links
Baseball Reference

1866 births
1906 deaths
Boston Beaneaters players
Boston University Terriers baseball players
Cincinnati Reds players
Chicago Colts players
Cleveland Spiders players
Major League Baseball pitchers
New York Giants (NL) players
Philadelphia Athletics (AA 1891) players
Washington Senators (1891–1899) players
19th-century baseball players
Worcester Grays players
Troy Trojans (minor league) players
Providence Clamdiggers (baseball) players
Albany Senators players
Syracuse Stars (minor league baseball) players
Utica Stars players
Portland (minor league baseball) players
Bangor Millionaires players
Kansas City Blues (baseball) players
Baseball players from Boston